is a Japanese athlete specialising in the high hurdles. He represented his country at the 2017 World Championships without qualifying for the semifinals.

His personal bests are 13.52 seconds in the 110 metres hurdles (+1.5 m/s, Hiroshima 2017) and 7.80 seconds in the 60 metres hurdles (Tehran 2018).

International competitions

References

1990 births
Living people
Japanese male hurdlers
World Athletics Championships athletes for Japan
Sportspeople from Saitama Prefecture